3D Tanx is a shoot 'em up video game written by Don Priestley and published by DK'Tronics in 1982 for the ZX Spectrum, Commodore 64, and BBC Micro.

Gameplay
The aim of the game is to shoot tanks moving across a bridge, shown in the distance into the screen. The player aims a gun turret by adjusting its rotation and elevation, this being the '3D' aspect of the game. Skill and timing is required to strike the tanks.

Reception
Crash magazine wrote, "The graphics are very good and so is the sound," and concluded,"...and at the price, excellent value."

References

1982 video games
ZX Spectrum games
Commodore 64 games
BBC Micro and Acorn Electron games
Shoot 'em ups
Video games developed in the United Kingdom
Single-player video games